Magnolia Beach is an unincorporated community in King County, in the U.S. state of Washington.

History
A post office called Magnolia Beach was established in 1908, and remained in operation until 1953. The community's name in part is a transfer from Magnolia, Iowa, the former home of a family of first settlers.

References

Unincorporated communities in King County, Washington
Unincorporated communities in Washington (state)